Belle of the Yukon is a 1944 American comedy musical Western film produced and directed by William A. Seiter and starring Randolph Scott, Gypsy Rose Lee, Dinah Shore and Bob Burns. Based on a story by Houston Branch and set in the days of the great Canadian Gold Rush, the film is about a "reformed" con artist-turned-dance hall owner whose girlfriend, played by Gypsy Rose Lee, tries to keep him on the straight and narrow.

Plot
In a Yukon town called Malemute, a saloon owned by "Honest" John Calhoun gets a new star performer, Belle De Valle, while he's away. A stranger in town, Sam Slade, offers to keep an eye on things until the boss returns, while saloon manager Pop Candless and crooked town marshal Maitland keep a suspicious eye on him.

As soon as Honest John gets back, Belle hits him with a vase. They were acquainted in Seattle, where according to Belle, he was actually a con man known as Gentleman Jack who ditched her after becoming wanted by the law for his dishonest ways.

Pop's attractive daughter Lettie is attracted to Steve Atterbury, the piano player. Pop is leery and finds a letter indicating that Steve is already married with children. Steve is ambushed and put on a boat to Nome, giving the impression that he has coldly left Lettie behind.

Honest John is secretly plotting a gold theft. He gains the town's trust and is named bank president. Belle discovers the scheme and starts a run of the bank, making Honest John pay off customers with money he'd planned to use in his scam.

Everything turns out for the best, though, because Steve jumps ship and makes it back to Malemute to win Lettie back, helped by the arrival of his sister, Cherie, and their wealthy father, C.V. Atterbury, who vouches that Steve is unmarried and, as a gesture of good faith, places $100,000 in the bank. Honest John promises to actually be honest from now on.

Cast
 Randolph Scott as Honest John Calhoun 
 Gypsy Rose Lee as Belle De Valle
 Dinah Shore as Lettie Candless
 Bob Burns as Sam Slade 
 Charles Winninger as Pop Candless
 William Marshall as Steve Atterbury
 Guinn "Big Boy" Williams as Sheriff Mervin Maitland
 Robert Armstrong as George
 Florence Bates as Viola Chase
 Victor Kilian as Professor Salsbury
 Wanda McKay as Cherie Atterbury
 Edward Fielding as C.V. Atterbury
 Jane Hale as Dance Specialty
 Harry Tenbrook as Harry (uncredited)

Awards

In 1946, Belle of the Yukon received Academy Award nominations for Best Original Song and Best Music Scoring.

Radio adaptation

Belle of the Yukon was presented on Screen Guild Players February 12, 1945. The 30-minute adaptation starred Scott, Shore, Burns and Gail Patrick.

See also
List of American films of 1944

References

External links
 
 
 

1944 films
Films directed by William A. Seiter
RKO Pictures films
American black-and-white films
American musical comedy films
1944 musical comedy films
American Western (genre) comedy films
1940s Western (genre) comedy films
Films scored by Arthur Lange
American Western (genre) musical films
1940s Western (genre) musical films
1940s American films
1940s English-language films